Agonidium parvicolle is a species of ground beetle in the subfamily Platyninae. It was described by Basilewsky in 1958.

References

parvicolle
Beetles described in 1958